Charlotte Corbeil-Coleman is a Canadian playwright, screenwriter and actress.  Her 2008 play, Scratch, was nominated for the Dora Mavor Moore Award for Outstanding New Play in 2009, was a prizewinner in the Herman Voaden Playwriting Competition, and was nominated for the Governor General's Award for English-language drama at the 2010 Governor General's Awards.  

Guarded Girls, Corbeil-Coleman's 2019 play about women in the Canadian prison system, premiered at Tarragon Theatre in Toronto and then was performed in Kitchener-Waterloo at Green Light Arts, which had originally commissioned it. It received the Dora Mavor Moore Award for Outstanding New Play and was shortlisted for the 2020 Governor General's Award for English-language drama.

In 2022, Corbeil-Coleman's holiday musical Almost a Full Moon, based on Hawksley Workman's Christmas album of the same name, premiered at the Citadel Theatre in Edmonton.  

Corbeil-Coleman's other work as a playwright includes The End of Pretending (2001); Highway 63: The Fort Mac Show (2009); The CN Tower Show (2012); and Sudden Death (2013). She co-wrote Twisted (2015) with Joseph Jomo Pierre. 

She has also been a writer for the Showcase drama King and the CBC Radio drama series Afghanada.

The daughter of novelist Carole Corbeil and actor Layne Coleman, she has also had acting roles in television, including the series Blue Murder and Show Me Yours. In 2005 she appeared in the television film Mayday. She is married to theatre critic J. Kelly Nestruck.

References

Canadian women dramatists and playwrights
Canadian stage actresses
Canadian television actresses
Living people
Canadian radio writers
Women radio writers
21st-century Canadian dramatists and playwrights
21st-century Canadian women writers
Year of birth missing (living people)